Hierodoris squamea is a moth of the family Oecophoridae. It is endemic to New Zealand and is found in the mountains of Fiordland as well as the Olivine Range in south Westland. This species has a wingspan of between 12 and 13 mm and can be distinguished from similar species as it is very small in size, has a reduced eyespot on its forewings, clearly visible through Scanning Electron Microscope preparations, and has orange-yellow scales overlaying its dark forewing. It prefers open country of tussock grasslands and herbfields at high altitudes. As at 2005 the larvae is unknown. Adults are on the wing in January.

Taxonomy 
This species was first described by Alfred Philpott in 1915 and named Gymnobathra squamea. Both George Hudson and J. S. Dugdale discussed this species under this name. Hudson synonymised Gymnobathra nigra with G. squamea in 1939 stating that the holotype for G. nigra was a worn specimen of G. squamea. In 2005 Robert Hoare placed this species within the genus Hierodoris. The male holotype specimen, collected at Cleughearn at 3500 feet by Philpott, is held at the New Zealand Arthropod Collection.

Description

Philpott described this species as follows:
This species has a wingspan of between 12 and 13 mm and can be distinguished from similar species as it is very small in size, has a reduced eyespot on its forewings, clearly visible through Scanning Electron Microscope preparations, and has orange-yellow scales overlaying its dark forewing. As at 2005 the larvae is unknown.

Distribution 
This species is endemic to New Zealand and is found in the mountains of Fiordland as well as the Olivine Range in south Westland.

Behaviour 
This species is on the wing in January.

Habitat and hosts 
This species prefers open country of tussock grasslands and herbfields at high altitudes.

References 

Moths described in 1915
Moths of New Zealand
Oecophoridae
Endemic fauna of New Zealand
Taxa named by Alfred Philpott
Endemic moths of New Zealand